is The Brilliant Green's twelfth single, released in 2002. It peaked at #10 on the Oricon singles chart.

Track listing

References

2002 singles
The Brilliant Green songs
Songs written by Tomoko Kawase
Songs written by Shunsaku Okuda
2002 songs
Defstar Records singles

ja:Forever to me 〜終わりなき悲しみ〜